The Culmback Dam (also known as the George Culmback Dam or the Snoqualmie National Forest Dam) is a large rockfill hydroelectric and water supply dam on the Sultan River, a tributary of the Skykomish River, in Washington. Its reservoir, Spada Lake, provides water for 70 to 75 percent of Snohomish County and feeds the Jackson Hydro Project, providing 112 megawatts of clean energy to Snohomish county. Some critics charge that the dam has strongly impacted the runs of salmon and other migratory fish in the Sultan River by depleting gravel and sediment needed to line the riverbed. The dam's operator counters that Culmback Dam dramatically reduces flooding events, benefiting fish populations and the surrounding communities. The dam was named in honor of George Culmback, a former mayor of Everett.

The Dam is co-owned by the Snohomish County PUD and the City of Everett and is operated by the PUD. Water from Spada Lake is diverted through a pipeline to a powerhouse further downstream on the Sultan River. From the powerhouse, some water is returned to the river, and some is diverted to Lake Chaplain, where the water enters the Everett water supply system.

Construction and other additions
Prior to 1917 the City of Everett received its water supply from Woods Creek, a tributary of the Snohomish River. Because of increasing water needs of large paper mills and factories, the city switched its water supply to the Sultan River basin via the tributary Chaplain Creek. The Chaplain Reservoir was created in 1929 with the completion of an earthfill dam, and later raised in 1942. This supply proved insufficient as well, so engineers looked to tap the main stem of the Sultan River, where an excellent dam site had been identified.
 
The Culmback Dam was built in two stages, or phases. Phase 2, completed in 1984, involved raising the dam  to its present height, quadrupling the reservoir capacity. The second phase also included the pipeline connecting Spada Lake to a new hydroelectric powerhouse and from there to the Chaplain Reservoir.

In June 2016, the PUD began demolition of the dam's sluiceway to re-open the upper Sultan River basin to spawning fish.

Site

The river eroded a narrow gorge to empty into the Skykomish River, forming an ideal dam site.

The Sultan River, formed by the convergence of the North Fork of the Sultan River and Elk Creek, enters the lake from the east. Additional major contributors are the South Fork, which forms an arm of the lake close to Stickney Ridge, and Williamson Creek, which enters from the north at the base of Big Four Mountain.

Water supply and power
Spada Lake is part of the water supply of the City of Everett, Washington, serving 80 percent of Snohomish County. This water supply consists of two lakes, the other being the much smaller,  Lake Chaplain on Chaplain Creek, a tributary of the Sultan River. At the powerhouse, the water feeds four turbine/generator units, consisting of two 47.5 MW Pelton-type turbines, and two 8.4 MW Francis turbines. The water from the Pelton turbines is released directly into the Sultan River, while the rest of the water is piped to Lake Chaplain.

From Lake Chaplain, the water flows in four  diameter pipes towards Everett. During flood events, water is also discharged back into the Sultan River through Chaplain Creek and the Sultan River Fresh-water Return Line.

Recreation

The area around the dam and Spada Lake is visited by 5,000 people annually for a variety of recreational activities, including boating, hiking, fishing, and kayaking. The lake has two boat launches and prohibits combustion engines.

References

Dams in Washington (state)
Hydroelectric power plants in Washington (state)
Rock-filled dams
Buildings and structures in Snohomish County, Washington
Dams completed in 1965
Energy infrastructure completed in 1965
1965 establishments in Washington (state)